Rigby is a city in and the county seat of Jefferson County, Idaho, United States. The population was 3,945 at the 2010 census, up from 2,998 in 2000.

History
Rigby was founded by members of the Church of Jesus Christ of Latter-day Saints in 1884 and incorporated in 1903. The community was named after William F. Rigby, a prominent early settler and member of the church. A significant majority of Rigby's residents, as well as those of the outlying communities, are members of the Church of Jesus Christ of Latter-Day Saints. Baptist, Presbyterian, and Lutheran faiths also have current local congregations.

Demographics

2010 census
As of the census of 2010, there were 3,945 people, 1,328 households, and 994 families living in the city. The racial makeup of the city was 89.5% White, 0.2% African American, 0.9% Native American, 0.5% Asian, 0.2% Pacific Islander, 6.7% from other races, and 2.1% from two or more races. Hispanic or Latino of any race were 11.8% of the population.

There were 1,328 households, of which 45.3% had children under the age of 18 living with them, 57.0% were married couples living together, 13.3% had a female householder with no husband present, 4.5% had a male householder with no wife present, and 25.2% were non-families. 21.8% of all households were made up of individuals, and 9% had someone living alone who was 65 years of age or older. The average household size was 2.91 and the average family size was 3.43.

The median age in the city was 27.6 years. 34.3% of residents were under the age of 18; 10.3% were between the ages of 18 and 24; 28.5% were from 25 to 44; 16.5% were from 45 to 64; and 10.3% were 65 years of age or older. The gender makeup of the city was 47.4% male and 52.6% female.

2000 census
As of the census of 2000, there were 2,998 people, 1,051 households, and 789 families living in the city. The racial makeup of the city was 91.16% White, 0.43% African American, 0.87% Native American, 0.40% Asian, 0.07% Pacific Islander, 5.64% from other races, and 1.43% from two or more races. Hispanic or Latino of any race were 11.67% of the population.

There were 1,051 households, out of which 42.8% had children under the age of 18 living with them, 60.2% were married couples living together, 11.7% had a female householder with no husband present, and 24.9% were non-families. 22.7% of all households were made up of individuals, and 12.5% had someone living alone who was 65 years of age or older. The average household size was 2.83 and the average family size was 3.36.

In the city, the population was spread out, with 33.7% under the age of 18, 11.4% from 18 to 24, 24.2% from 25 to 44, 17.4% from 45 to 64, and 13.4% who were 65 years of age or older. The median age was 28 years. For every 100 females, there were 91.8 males. For every 100 females age 18 and over, there were 88.2 males.

The median income for a household in the city was $30,192, and the median income for a family was $36,417. Males had a median income of $32,316 versus $18,269 for females. The per capita income for the city was $12,795. About 10.5% of families and 12.1% of the population were below the poverty line, including 13.2% of those under age 18 and 10.0% of those age 65 or over.

Geography 

Climate
According to the Köppen climate classification, Rigby has a warm-summer humid continental climate (Dfb).

Many tributaries of the Snake River run through the Rigby area including the Henry’s Fork, South Fork, and others. With the large amount of water, Jefferson County surrounding Rigby is the largest cottonwood forest west of the Mississippi River.

Economy
Many Rigby citizens commute to jobs in Rexburg or Idaho Falls, and a number of residents work for the federal government or federal contractors through the Idaho National Laboratory (INL), locally called "The Site".

Arts and culture
The Farnsworth TV & Pioneer Museum has Philo Farnsworth's television-related work, including an original TV tube he developed, on display.

Education
Jefferson County School District 251 is the local school district. Rigby High School is the primary high school within the city, serving grades 9–12. Jefferson High School exists as an alternative high school for high-need students. Rigby Middle School and Philo T. Farnsworth Middle School serve grades 6–8. "Trojans" is the mascot for both of the middle schools and Rigby High School; the team colors are maroon and gold. The community supports six elementary schools: Cottonwood Elementary, Midway Elementary, South Fork Elementary, Jefferson Elementary, Roberts Elementary, and Harwood Elementary. There is also the Rigby Virtual Academy serving K–8 and the Early Childhood Center serving special needs aged 3–5. These schools also serve residents from neighboring areas such as Menan, Lewisville, and Roberts. Rigby has a long-standing rivalry with Madison.

Rigby High School currently has 10 state titles in Boys Basketball, and in 2019 Won their first state title in football, defeating Coeur d'Alene 57-56 in double overtime. The two schools had previously played in week one of the same season, with Coeur d'Alene winning.

Notable people

 Philo Farnsworth, inventor and early television pioneer
 Vardis Fisher, author
 Gail Halvorsen, retired Air Force pilot
 Brent Hill, politician
 H. Rex Lee, 44th and 50th governor of American Samoa
 Wayne Quinton, inventor of the treadmill and biomedical devices
 Larry Wilson, Pro Football Hall of Fame NFL player

See also
 List of cities in Idaho

References

External links

 
 Rigby Chamber of Commerce

Cities in Jefferson County, Idaho
Cities in Idaho
County seats in Idaho
Cities in Idaho Falls metropolitan area
Populated places established in 1883